Willkie is a surname. Notable people with the surname include:

Philip Willkie (1919–1974), American banker
Wendell Willkie (1892–1944), American lawyer and politician; 1940 Republican Party presidential nominee

See also
Wilkie (surname)
Willkie Farr & Gallagher, international law firm
Wendell Willkie (relief), plaque created by artist Paul Fjelde
Wilke
Wilkie (disambiguation)
Willke
Willikies